Seldovia (Dena'ina: Angidahtnu) is a city in Kenai Peninsula Borough, Alaska, United States.  Its population was 255 at the 2010 census, down from 286 in 2000. It is located along Kachemak Bay southwest of Homer. There is no road system connecting the town to other communities, so all travel to Seldovia is by airplane or boat.

The Alaska Native people of Seldovia make up approximately one quarter of the population and have ancestors of Aleut and Alutiiq (Sugpiaq) descent, as well as some Dena'ina.

History

The native residents are mixed Dena'ina Athabaskan Indian and Alutiiq (Sugpiaq) Eskimo. In 1787 or 1788 a Russian fur trade post named Aleksandrovskaia was established at today's Seldovia by hunting parties under Evstratii Ivanovich Delarov, of the Shelikhov-Golikov company, precursor of the Russian-American Company.
Although there has been little definitive archeological evidence of human habitation at Seldovia prior to  the 1800s, it is said  the early Russian St. Nicholas Orthodox Church, started in 1820, was built on top of an older aboriginal Inuit village site. The town's original Russian name, Seldevoy, translates to "Herring Bay", as there was a significant herring population prior to rampant overfishing early in the 20th century.

Until the development of a more complete road system in Alaska, Seldovia was an important "first stop" for ships sailing from Seward, Kodiak and other points outside Cook Inlet.  At one time Seldovia was home to over 2,000 residents, but today fewer than 300 persons reside year round.

The town was one of many communities along the shores of Cook Inlet, noted for having one of the most severe tidal movements in North America. Similar to the dramatic tides of Bay of Fundy, the Cook Inlet's waters prior to 1964 would rise or fall 26 feet every six hours during the peak tides.

After the Good Friday earthquake on March 27, 1964, which registered 9.2 on the moment magnitude scale, the surrounding land mass dropped six feet.  Seldovia's "boardwalk" before the earthquake was thick wooden plank and piling, and the town's main street was built almost entirely along the waterfront. Most of the community's businesses, and many homes were similarly constructed upon pilings on either side of this "street".  The sudden sinking of the land caused higher tides, peaking at 32 feet, to completely submerge the boardwalk and flood the homes and businesses along the waterfront.

The waterfront was rebuilt (known at the time as "urban renewal") using fill from Cap's Hill, which was demolished to rebuild the town on higher ground. There is only one small portion of the boardwalk left; this section of the boardwalk was built decades after the original boardwalk and it is known to the townfolk as "the new boardwalk", even though it is now the only boardwalk. The original boardwalk is completely gone, destroyed during the urban renewal process, along with many homes and businesses.

Seldovia has been home to many industries, including fox farming, berry picking and commercial fishing, including King Crab fishing. Logging and mining have also featured in local history. Today charter boats keep busy bringing the visiting sport fishermen to the fishing grounds of Kachemak Bay and other nearby waters.

Demographics

Seldovia first appeared on the 1880 U.S. Census as the unincorporated villages of Seldovia and Ostrovki. Of the 74 residents, 38 were Creole (Mixed Russian and Native) and 36 were Inuit. In 1890, it returned as Seldovia, and reported 99 residents, of which 83 were Native and 16 Creole. It has reported in every successive census. It formally incorporated in 1945.

As of the census of 2010, there were 255 people, 121 households, and 66 families residing in the city. The racial makeup of the city was 72.5% White, 1.2% Black or African American, 13.7% Native American, 1.2% Asian, 0.0% Pacific Islander, 0.0% from other races, and 11.4% from two or more races.  3.9% of the population were Hispanic or Latino of any race.

There were 121 households, out of which 19.8% had children under the age of 18 living with them, 44.6% were married couples living together, 6.6% had a female householder with no husband present, 3.3% had a male householder with no wife present, and 45.5% were non-families. 35.5% of all households were made up of individuals, and 12.4% had someone living alone who was 65 years of age or older.  The average household size was 2.11 and the average family size was 2.67.

In the city, the age distribution of the population shows 20.0% under the age of 18, 3.6% from 18 to 24, 21.2% from 25 to 44, 37.2% from 45 to 64, and 18.1% who were 65 years of age or older.  The median age was 48.2 years. For every 100 females, there were 104 males.  For every 100 females age 18 and over, there were 114.7 males.

The median income for a household in the city was $50,313, and the median income for a family was $68,750. Males had a median income of $61,875 versus $21,667 for females. The per capita income for the city was $30,754.  About 1.7% of families and 8.7% of the population were below the poverty line, including 2.2% of those under the age of eighteen and 1.9% of those 65 or over.

Geography
Seldovia is on the Kenai Peninsula on the south shore of Kachemak Bay opposite Homer. The community is located in the Seldovia Recording District.

Seldovia sea level change is -9.96 mm/yr, over the last 50 years it is about -19.6 inches or -1.6 ft.

Climate
Seldovia has snowy winters and brief dry summers (Koppen Dsc).

Economy

The school, Seldovia Village Tribe, City, and commercial fishing related businesses are the dominant employers in town.

Education
The Susan B. English Grade K-12 School, opened on August 30, 1972. The girl’s volleyball team won the 2002 State Championship in the 1A, 2A, 3A West division. The boys basketball team won the state championship in the 1A division in 2015.

Notable people
 Nell Scott (c. 1901),  the first woman elected to Alaska's territorial legislature
 Dana Stabenow (born 1952), writer

In fiction
In children adventure book Pugs of the Frozen North by Philip Reeve and Sarah McIntyre, name, description and visual depiction of the town Snowdovia is based on that of Seldovia.

See also

 Jakolof Bay, Alaska and Seldovia Village, Alaska, populated places located adjacent to Seldovia but outside of its city limits
 Seldovia Police Department

References

External links
 Seldovia city government website
 Seldovia. Alaska Chamber of commerce
 

Cities in Alaska
Cities in Kenai Peninsula Borough, Alaska
Populated coastal places in Alaska on the Pacific Ocean